The Al-Khadeejah Mosque is a mosque in Nukuʻalofa, Tongatapu, Tonga.

History
The mosque was established in 2010 with funds from foreign donors. In 2018, the mosque was damaged by the Cyclone Gita.

See also
 Islam in Tonga

References

2010 establishments in Tonga
Islam in Tonga
Mosques completed in 2010
Mosques in Oceania
Religious buildings and structures in Tonga
Buildings and structures in Nukuʻalofa